Karl Fischer may refer to:

* Karl Fischer (chemist) (1901–1958), German originator of Karl Fischer titration
  (1918–1963), Austrian politician
  (1888–?), Austrian football coach: Pogoń Lwów, Legia Warsaw
 Karl Fischer (leftist) (fl. 1940s), German militant in Left Communism
 Karl Fischer (architect) (born 1948), Canadian architect
 Karl Fischer (footballer), Estonian footballer
 Karl von Fischer (1782–1820), German architect
 Karl Fischer (actor), German actor known for co-starring in the Donna Leon TV series
 Karl Fischer von Treuenfeld (1885–1946), Generalleutnant of Waffen SS
 Karl Fischer (photographer), German-born Russian photographer

See also 
 Carl Fischer (disambiguation)